In the United States, sentencing law varies by jurisdiction. The jurisdictions in the US legal system are federal, state, regional, and county. Each jurisdictional entity has governmental bodies that create common, statutory, and regulatory law, although some legal issues are handled more often at the federal level, while other issues are the domain of the states. Civil rights, immigration, interstate commerce, and constitutional issues are subject to federal jurisdiction. Issues such as domestic relations, which includes domestic violence; marriage and divorce; corporations; property; contracts; and criminal laws are generally governed by states, unless there is federal preemption.

Sentences are typically determined by a judge, in a separate hearing, after the jury (or other finder of fact) has issued findings of fact and a guilty verdict. In some cases after the probation department has carried out a pre-sentence investigation. Juries generally have little involvement in sentencing, except in some death penalty cases (which are exceptionally rare).

Trends in sentencing law

In the 1970s, the length of incarceration had increased in response to the rising crime rates in the United States.

In 1987 the U.S. Sentencing Guidelines were created to establish sentencing policies and practices for the federal criminal justice system. The Guidelines prescribe a reduction of sentence time for most defendants who accept responsibility and plead guilty; further discounts are available to some defendants through fact bargaining, substantial assistance, and so on.

Life imprisonment increased by 83% between 1992 and 2003 due to the implementation of three strikes laws. Short-term sentencing, mandatory minimums, and guideline-based sentencing began to remove the human element from sentencing. They also required the judge to consider the severity of a crime in determining the length of an offender's sentence.

Federal court statistics from 2003 show that the average sentence given for offenses resolved by guilty plea was 54.7 months, while the average sentence for offenses resolved by trial was 153.7 months. The practice of giving much harsher sentences when a defendant chooses to exercise the right to a trial by a jury of his or her peers has been controversial, as is seen as a personal act of anger by the judge over "wasting court time."

Determinate and Indeterminate Sentencing

Indeterminate sentencing 
In some states, a judge will sentence criminals to an indeterminate amount of time in prison for certain crimes. This period is often between 1 and 3 years (on the short end) and 5–50 years on the upper end. The legislature generally sets a short, mandatory minimum sentence that an offender must spend in prison (e.g. one-third of the minimum sentence, or one-third of the high end of a sentence). The parole board then sets the actual date of prison release, as well as the rules that the parolee must follow when released.

During a long sentence, an offender can take full advantage of the programs that the prison has, including rehab for substance use disorders, anger management, mental health, and so on, so when the offender completes the rehab or program he may be released upon request from authorities with a lower risk of recidivism. This process tries to combat the tendency of prisoners leaving incarceration after a long sentence to go back to offending in short order, without any attempt at correcting their ways.

Determinate sentencing 
Those given short sentences usually serve the full-time (do "day-for-day") as imposed by the judge, or might receive time off for good behavior, based on state or local rules and regulations.

In the mid-1970s, most state and federal prisons moved from long term to short term sentencing. Over time, though, state and federal authorities have gradually migrated their philosophies back toward long-term sentences. Many states use a mixture of the two; e.g., some offenders may receive sentences reduced by several months due to rehabilitation, counseling, and other programs, as well as good time.

Sentencing of convicted murderers by US State
The United States does not have a specific guideline for sentencing murderers, including serial killers. When a killer is apprehended, he will be charged with murder, and if convicted can get life in prison or receive the death penalty, depending on in which state the murders took place. Generally speaking, each victim of a murder will merit a separate charge of murder against the offender, and as such, the killer could get a life sentence, a death sentence, or some other determinate or indeterminate sentence based upon the number of murders, the evidence presented, and any aggravating or mitigating circumstances present. Such a compounded sentence may be tailored to run consecutively, with one sentence beginning after completion of another, or concurrently, where all or most of several sentences are served together. 

In 2002, the Supreme Court ruled in Atkins v. Virginia that the execution of adults (18 and over) with intellectual disabilities or with severe mental illness (depending on the state) was cruel and unconstitutional under the eighth amendment. Three years later in Roper v. Simmons (2005), the Supreme Court extended the ban of the death penalty against capital crimes committed by juveniles who were under 18 years of age at the time due to the developing brain not being developed enough to completely hold the individual accountable.

In the 2010 case of Graham v. Florida, the Supreme Court ruled that juveniles who committed crimes other than murder cannot be sentenced to life imprisonment without parole. In 2012, the court later ruled in Miller v. Alabama that offenders under the age of 18 must be eligible for parole if sentenced to life imprisonment even for those convicted of murder except if the child is declared to be "permanently incorrigible" meaning the child will never improve their behavior. However, in 2021, the Supreme Court in Jones v. Mississippi removed the requirement that judges must find a juvenile incorrigible to hand down life imprisonment without parole, making it easier for a judge to sentence a minor convicted of murder to life without parole.

Criminal sentencing of women in the US 

The United States generates 30 percent of all incarcerated women in the world, despite only comprising five percent of the global female population. Multiple studies have been conducted to analyze the differences in the crimes committed by men and women, as well as the sentencing of such offenders.

Women have been found to on average receive lighter sentences and penalties than male defendants in the United States. However, the degree of preferential treatment varies by the type of offense committed. Women are less likely than male offenders to receive a prison sentence for property crimes and drug offenses. When female offenders do receive a prison sentence, research has found women receive shorter sentences than male offenders for the same offense. The level of preferential treatment shown to female offenders was lower when the offense went against perceived gender norms. Women who committed more "masculine crimes," such as violent offenses or crimes against children, were not treated preferentially during sentencing.

Within the scope of capital punishment, women are far less likely to receive a death sentence and even less likely to actually face execution. Between 1973 to 2012, women comprised only 2.1% of death sentences imposed at trial and merely 0.9% of persons executed. Women who are sentenced to death at trial are more likely to receive executive clemency than their male counterparts, despite their crime having more aggravating factors that may increase sentencing outcomes.

Researchers have developed theories that concentrate on the differences between the treatment of each gender by society. A possible explanation for disproportionate sentencing is the chivalry thesis which states that gendered stereotypes influence sentencing outcomes as women are considered childlike, less threatening, less dangerous, and not responsible for their behaviors. This theory also maintains that men are traditionally inclined to minimize the suffering of women as a result of their paternalistic desire and this behavior has been incorporated into the justice system as it is a male-dominated field. Judges primarily explained sentencing differentials as a result of childcare responsibilities that would create a larger social cost if mothers were incarcerated, illustrating direct applications of the chivalry thesis. Others argue the disparity in sentencing is merely the result of human error as a result of the dynamics of judicial decision-making. The focal concerns theory reaffirms this belief as this theory states that the sentencing disparity is the result of a judge's inability to spend a large amount of time on a single case and the incomplete information given to them minimizes their ability to make a fully informed decision. As a result, judges may unknowingly rely on generalizations of personal biases to guide sentencing decisions.

In an attempt to prevent preferential treatment to particular genders, races, ethnicities, or socio-economic classes, the Federal Sentencing Guidelines were enacted to create sentencing uniformity and equality. The enactment of these guidelines has since increased sentences given to women at trial; however, the disparity between male and female offenders persists as the internal biases influencing preferential sentencing have not been addressed.

See also
History of mandatory sentencing in the United States
History of United States Prison Systems
United States constitutional sentencing law
Federal Sentencing Guidelines
Taylor v. United States
United States Sentencing Commission
United States v. Booker

References